Pompeianus may refer to:

 Tiberius Claudius Pompeianus Quintianus, son of Syrian Roman consul Tiberius Claudius Pompeianus
 Tiberius Claudius Pompeianus, Roman general of emperor Marcus Aurelius.
 Ruricius Pompeianus, Praetorian prefect 
 Lucius Aurelius Commodus Pompeianus, son of Tiberius Claudius Pompeianus Quintianus; Roman consul in 209
 Lucius Tiberius Claudius Pompeianus, son of Lucius Aurelius Commodus Pompeianus; Roman consul in 236
 Gabinius Barbarus Pompeianus, fifth-century praefectus urbi